The director-general of the British Broadcasting Corporation is chief executive and (from 1994) editor-in-chief of the BBC.

The post-holder was formerly appointed by the Board of Governors of the BBC (for the period 1927 to 2007) and then the BBC Trust (from 2007 to 2017). Since 2017 the director-general has been appointed by the BBC Board.

To date, 17 individuals have been appointed director-general, plus an additional two who were appointed in an acting capacity only. The current director-general is Tim Davie, who succeeded Tony Hall on 1 September 2020.

List of directors-general

Italics indicate that the individual was temporarily appointed as acting director-general.

References

External links
 The BBC press office's biographical list of its Directors General 
 BBC director-general-portraits
 Director-General info

1927 establishments in England